Erebus hieroglyphica is a moth of the family Erebidae. It is found from the Oriental tropical countries such as India, Pakistan, Sri Lanka, Bangladesh, Japan, China, Taiwan, Cambodia, Laos, Myanmar, Thailand, Vietnam, Indonesia, Philippines, Malaysia, Singapore, and Korea. The habitat consist of lowland forests.

Description

Its wingspan is about 88 mm. Adults exhibit strong sexual dimorphism. In both sexes there is usually a pale cream to white bar at the costa on the forewings, with a small pale patch in the centre of the wing. They have been reported feeding on the juices of tropical fruit.

Male with vein 3 running to the functional apex of hindwing. The costal fold obsolete, and the small patch with gland. Male with veins 4 to 8 of hindwings moderately developed in the aborted costal area. Body rich blackish brown. Forewings with a whorl-shaped black mark beyond end of cell, bilobed and expanding at head, where it is outlined with blue. An oblique yellow bar runs from costa near apex, and very few show reaching outer margin.

Female has brown body with black stria. Forewings with white oblique bar. Both wings with traces of postmedial band of whitish marks and white spot on forewing above vein 3.

References

Moths described in 1773
Erebus (moth)
Taxa named by Dru Drury